Omar Ezequiel Browne Zúñiga (born 3 May 1994) is a Panamanian professional footballer who plays as a forward for Panamanian Football League club Tauro F.C. and the Panama national team.

Club career
Browne has played for several Liga Panameña de Fútbol clubs including Plaza Amador, Sporting San Miguelito, Chorrillo, Independiente, and Tauro, as well as for Montreal Impact and Forge FC in Canada on loan.

Independiente
In February 2019, Browne scored two goals against Toronto FC in two games to help Independiente reach the 2019 CONCACAF Champions League quarter-finals.

Montreal Impact
After a successful showing in the Champions League, Browne was loaned to the Montreal Impact for the 2019 season with an option to buy. In his debut match with the club, Browne scored the winning goal in a 1–0 victory against the Chicago Fire on 28 April.

Forge FC 
In June 2021, Browne was acquired on loan by Canadian Premier League side Forge FC. However, after being unable to join the club due to a visa issue and in August, re-joined Independiente for training. On September 24, he was finally cleared to join Forge. He made his debut on September 25, scoring the winning goal in a substitute appearance in a 2–1 victory over Pacific FC. Three days later, he appeared in a 2021 CONCACAF League match against his parent club Independiente.

In January 2022, Forge announced that is had extended Browne's loan ahead of the club's debut in the CONCACAF Champions League. However, he ultimately never joined the team for its 2022 season.

Tauro F.C. 
In November 2022, Browne joined Tauro F.C. for the club’s Apertura 2023 campaign.

International career
Browne made his first appearance for Panama in April 2018, against Trinidad and Tobago.

Career statistics

External links

References

1994 births
Living people
Association football forwards
Panamanian footballers
Sportspeople from Panama City
Panamanian expatriate footballers
Expatriate soccer players in Canada
Panamanian expatriate sportspeople in Canada
Expatriate footballers in Costa Rica
Panamanian expatriate sportspeople in Costa Rica
Expatriate footballers in Israel
Panamanian expatriate sportspeople in Israel
C.D. Plaza Amador players
Sporting San Miguelito players
CF Montréal players
A.D. San Carlos footballers
Hapoel Tel Aviv F.C. players
C.A. Independiente de La Chorrera players
Forge FC players
Liga Panameña de Fútbol players
Liga FPD players
Israeli Premier League players
Panama international footballers
2019 CONCACAF Gold Cup players
Major League Soccer players
Canadian Premier League players
Tauro F.C. players